Chien Chung-liang is a Taiwanese politician. He was the Deputy Minister of Science and Technology since March 2014.

Early life
Chien obtained his bachelor's degree in zoology in 1984 and master's degree in anatomy in 1989 from National Taiwan University (NTU). He then obtained his doctoral degree in pathology from Columbia University in the United States in 1995.

Early careers
Chien was the associate professor of anatomy and cell biology of the College of Medicine of NTU in 1996-2006. In 1999, he was appointed as research scientist on cell biology at University of Tokyo, Japan. In 2007-2014, he was the deputy director of NTU Center of Genomic Medicine. In 2008-2014, he was the associate dean of NTU College of Medicine.

Political careers
In 2014, he was appointed as the Deputy Minister of the Interior, the position he held until 2016.

References

Living people
Ministers of Science and Technology of the Republic of China
Year of birth missing (living people)